Brian George Jones  (born 27 March 1947 in Bristol, England) is an English balloonist.

Brian Jones, along with Bertrand Piccard, co-piloted the first successful uninterrupted circumnavigation of the world on board a balloon, the Breitling Orbiter 3.  They set off on 1 March 1999 from Château d'Oex in Switzerland and landed in Egypt after a  flight lasting 19 days, 21 hours and 47 minutes. For this achievement, he received awards including the Harmon Trophy, the Hubbard Medal, the FAI Gold Air Medal, the Charles Green Salver, the Golden Plate Award of the American Academy of Achievement, and was appointed an Officer of the Order of the British Empire (OBE) in the 1999 Birthday Honours for services to ballooning.

Still active in ballooning records, In November 2010 Jones piloted the Esprit Breitling Orbiter as a launch platform for Yves Rossy. Rossy made the first successful attempt to perform loops using a jet-powered flying-wing backpack.

Jones grew up in Knowle, Bristol. He served for 13 years in the Royal Air Force. He is married to Joanna, a balloonist, and has two children. He co-authored the book The Greatest Adventure  with Bertrand Piccard.

References

External links
Milestones of Flight: Breitling Orbiter 3 Balloon Gondola Smithsonian National Air and Space Museum. Retrieved 29 May 2010

1947 births
Living people
People from Bristol
British balloonists
Harmon Trophy winners
Britannia Trophy winners
Officers of the Order of the British Empire
Recipients of the Olympic Order
Aerobatic record holders
Balloon flight record holders
British aviation record holders